Earl Richard Stewart Jr. (October 15, 1921 – July 11, 1990) was an American professional golfer who played on the PGA Tour in the 1950s and 1960s; and was a college head golf coach in the 1970s and 1980s.

Stewart was born in Dallas, Texas. He graduated from Dallas' Sunset High School in 1938. He attended Louisiana State University and was a member of the golf team. In 1941, he won the NCAA Championship, and led the Bayou Bengals to a share of the NCAA team title in 1942. He is a Member of the Sunset High School Hall of Fame.

Stewart had three wins in PGA Tour events during his career. His first win came in 1953 at the Greater Greensboro Open. He would win the Ardmore Open later that year. His best finishes in major championships were T10 at the 1952 U.S. Open and T16 at The Masters in 1953. Like many professional golfers of his generation, Stewart earned his living primarily as a club pro. His third and final win on the PGA Tour, the 1961 Dallas Open Invitational, came on his own course at the Oak Cliff Country Club.

Stewart was the head golf coach at Southern Methodist University from 1975–1987. He coached both the men's and women's teams. Men's golf was dropped by the university in 1980. He won a national championship with the women's team in 1979. One of his students was future two-time U.S. Open and PGA Champion Payne Stewart (no relation). In 1987, he was inducted into the National Golf Coaches Association Coaches Hall of Fame for his role as a women's collegiate golf coach at SMU.

Stewart died after a long illness at the age of 68 at his home in Quitman, Texas.

Amateur wins
1941 NCAA Championship (individual medalist)

Professional wins (4)

PGA Tour wins (3)

PGA Tour playoff record (1–2)

Other wins (1)
1950 Orlando Two-Ball (with Patty Berg)

References

American male golfers
LSU Tigers golfers
PGA Tour golfers
College golf coaches in the United States
Golfers from Dallas
Sportspeople from Dallas
People from Quitman, Texas
1921 births
1990 deaths